The Journal of Youth and Adolescence is a peer-reviewed multidisciplinary academic journal covering all aspects of youth and adolescence, including psychology and criminology. It was established in 1972 and is published 10 times per year by Springer Science+Business Media. The editor-in-chief is Roger J. R. Levesque (Indiana University). According to the Journal Citation Reports, the journal has a 2016 impact factor of 3.284.

References

External links

Multidisciplinary scientific journals
Springer Science+Business Media academic journals
Publications established in 1972
English-language journals
Adolescence journals
10 times per year journals